Grant Stone is an Australian librarian.  
He was the founder of Swancon.
He was a radio presenter on the radio station RTRFM of the Faster Than Light Radio Show, as well as being the main force in the Murdoch University library special collections of popular culture material.

In 1996 he was the recipient of the Chandler Award for Australian science fiction. He has been involved with laughter yoga for some years.

Notes

Australian librarians
People from Perth, Western Australia
Living people
Year of birth missing (living people)